Arena tram stop is a light rail stop in the Woodside area of South Norwood in the London Borough of Croydon in the southern suburbs of London. The stop is located by the Croydon Sports Arena and serves the council estates of Longheath Gardens Estate and Tollgate Estate.

The tram stop is located on a section of line which follows the trackbed of the former Woodside and South Croydon Railway, although there was no station at the location prior to the opening of Tramlink. The stop is at ground level on double track, with platforms on each side of the tracks.
Immediately to the east of the station is a junction where services diverge either to the north along a section of route specially constructed for Tramlink, or continue straight ahead along the former railway right of way. Just beyond this junction services bound for Elmers End becomes a single track for the rest of its journey.

The National Cycle Route 21 (the Waterlink Way) crosses the tram lines at Arena.

Services
Arena is served by tram services operated by Tramlink.

On Saturday evenings and Sundays, the service is reduced to a tram every 7-8 minutes to Wimbledon and a tram every 15 minutes to Elmers End and Beckenham Junction.

Services are operated using Bombardier CR4000 and Stadler Variobahn Trams.

Connections
The stop is served by London Buses route 289 which provides connections to Elmers End, Croydon Town Centre and Purley.

Free interchange for journeys made within an hour is available between bus services and between buses and trams is available at Arena as part of Transport for London's Hopper Fare.

See also
Woodside and South Croydon Railway

References

External links

Arena tram Stop – Timetables and live departures at Transport for London
Woodside & South Croydon railway
Arena tram stop on  The Trams website

Tramlink stops in the London Borough of Croydon
Railway stations in Great Britain opened in 2000